A fashion museum is dedicated to or features a significant collection of accessories or clothing. There is some overlap with textile museums.

Notable examples include the Costume Museum of Canada, the Fashion Museum, Bath, the Musée Galliera in Paris, and the Fashion Museum of the Province of Antwerp MoMu. National museums with significant fashion collections include the Victoria and Albert Museum in London. The Metropolitan Museum of Art in New York contains a collection of more than 75,000 costumes and accessories.

Another in London is the Fashion and Textile Museum, founded by designer Zandra Rhodes in 2003, and the only museum in Britain dedicated to showcasing developments in contemporary fashion, as well as providing inspiration, support and training for those working in the industry.

References